Niels Congo Turin Nielsen (22 January 1887 – 9 June 1964) was a Danish gymnast who competed in the 1908 Summer Olympics and in the 1920 Summer Olympics.

In 1908 he finished fourth with the Danish team in the team event. Twelve years later he was part of the Danish team, which won the gold medal in the gymnastics men's team, free system event.

References

1887 births
1964 deaths
Danish male artistic gymnasts
Olympic gymnasts of Denmark
Gymnasts at the 1908 Summer Olympics
Gymnasts at the 1920 Summer Olympics
Olympic gold medalists for Denmark
Olympic medalists in gymnastics
Medalists at the 1920 Summer Olympics